Frederic Charles Smerlas (born April 8, 1957) is a former American football nose tackle who was a five-time NFL Pro Bowl selection during a 14-year career as a nose tackle with the Buffalo Bills, San Francisco 49ers and New England Patriots.

Smerlas, of Greek-American descent, graduated from Waltham High School in 1975, where he was a star football player and wrestler. He became a defensive lineman for Boston College before embarking on an NFL career. Smerlas' 1990 autobiography, By a Nose, recounts his 11 years with the Bills and their climb from cellar-dwellers to Super Bowl contenders.

Smerlas currently resides in Massachusetts and is a part-time co-host during football season on sports radio WEEI-FM, NBC Sports Boston - The New England Tailgate Show, as well as a contributor to western New York radio station WHAM (AM) in Rochester.

In 2018, the Professional Football Researchers Association named Smerlas to the PFRA Hall of Very Good Class of 2018.

Two Time, Two sport All American in Wrestling and Football in High School; Two time New England heavyweight wrestling champ.

During Smerlas' playing career, he was the only player in the NFL who was of Greek descent.

Fred & Steve's Steakhouse

Smerlas, along with friend and colleague Steve DeOssie, opened an award-winning steakhouse at the Twin River Casino in Lincoln, Rhode Island in March 2007 called Fred & Steve's Steakhouse.

Political career

A Boston Herald article  announced on April 6, 2007 that Fred considered seeking the Massachusetts 5th US Congressional seat being vacated by Martin T. Meehan as a Republican candidate.

In 2010, Smerlas expressed an interest in relocating to Western New York to challenge Brian Higgins or Louise Slaughter, believing that they have not adequately represented Western New York or the upstate region as a whole. He indicated that his son was considering attending the University at Buffalo, and if he were to relocate, he may run either in 2010 or 2012, later ruling out a 2010 run. He said that his first priority "would be to take a big saw and cut New York City off."

See also
Most consecutive starts by a nose tackle

Bibliography
 Fred Smerlas and Vic Carucci, By A Nose: The Off-Center Life of Football's Funniest Lineman, Simon And Schuster, 1990.

References

External links
 
 Fred Smerlas Buffalo Hall of Fame
 Fred Smerlas Statistics
 Fred Smerlas Boston College
All Pro tailgate party Home Page

1957 births
Living people
American Conference Pro Bowl players
American football defensive linemen
American people of Greek descent
Boston College Eagles football players
Buffalo Bills players
Massachusetts Republicans
New England Patriots players
Players of American football from Massachusetts
San Francisco 49ers players
Sportspeople from Waltham, Massachusetts
Waltham High School alumni